RFA Gray Ranger was a British fleet support tanker of the Royal Fleet Auxiliary which served in World War II. She was torpedoed and sunk in the Greenland Sea by the German submarine U-435 on 22 September 1942 while travelling as part of Convoy QP 14.

References

Ranger-class tankers
1941 ships
Maritime incidents in September 1942
Ships sunk by German submarines in World War II
Ships built in Dundee
World War II shipwrecks in the Atlantic Ocean